2018 Hobart floods were severe weather events in the region of Hobart in Tasmania, Australia that caused widespread damage and flooding on 11 May 2018.

They were declared a disaster, as result of the damage.

Subsequent weather a week later also caused problems.

See also
1929 Tasmanian floods
June 1947 Tasmanian floods

Notes

Hobart
Floods in Tasmania
2018 disasters in Australia
2010s in Tasmania
May 2018 events in Australia